The New Zealand Department of Education was, prior to 1989, the public service department of the New Zealand Government that was responsible for pre-tertiary education.

The Department was established in its initial form in 1877 under the Education Act 1877.

In 1989 it was replaced by a decentralised Ministry of Education under the Tomorrow's Schools reforms that were initiated in response to the Picot task force report of May 1988. Some of its functions were moved to separate agencies such as Learning Media Limited (1992) and the New Zealand Qualifications Authority (1993).

See also
History of education in New Zealand
Education in New Zealand

References

External links
Article about the Department of Education from the 1966 Encyclopaedia of New Zealand
School administration and funding, article at Te Ara: The Encyclopedia of New Zealand

Education
New Zealand Public Service departments
History of education in New Zealand